Evita may refer to:

Arts
 Evita (1996 film), a 1996 American musical drama film based on the 1976 concept album of the same name
 Evita (2008 film), a documentary about Eva Péron
 Evita (album), a concept album released in 1976 and produced by Andrew Lloyd Webber and Tim Rice about Eva Péron
 Evita (musical), a stage musical by Andrew Lloyd Webber and Tim Rice
 Evita (soundtrack), the third soundtrack album by American singer Madonna from the 1996 film of the same name
 Evita Bezuidenhout, a character portrayed by South African performer, author, satirist, and social activist Pieter-Dirk Uys
 Evita Fusilier, a recurring character from the American television series Cloak & Dagger

People with the name
 Eva Perón (also Evita; 1919–1952), wife of Argentine President Juan Perón (1895–1974) and First Lady of Argentina
 Evita Robinson (born 1984), African-American woman known for her role as a pioneer of the urban travel movement

Other
 Evita (moth), a monotypic moth genus in the family Geometridae

See also
 Eva (name)
 Eve (name)
 Ieva
 Evita Movement, a social, piquetero and political movement of Argentina